Erik Sandvad Rasmussen (born 24 December 1960), nicknamed "The Wizard" and "TryllErik", is a former Danish football player and manager. He played two games for the Denmark national football team. In March 2014 it was announced that he would be a 2014 inductee into the Indoor Soccer Hall of Fame.

Player
During his active career, he was a forward for Danish clubs Køge, Herfølge, Frem and Brøndby.  In 1984, Rasmussen moved to the United States and signed with the Wichita Wings of the Major Indoor Soccer League.  He played five seasons for the Wings.  In 1988, he was the league's points leader and was named the MISL MVP.  In September 1989, but returned to Denmark and signed with Brøndby in order to make himself available to play for the national team.  In January 1998, he returned to the Wichita Wings who were now playing in the National Professional Soccer League.  He played for the Wings through the 1998–1999 season.  In June 1999, he then moved to the Baltimore Blast.

Coach
After retiring, he managed a number of Danish lower league clubs. In January 2004, he replaced Troels Bech as manager of Midtjylland in the top-flight Danish Superliga. In Midtjylland he led the team to a silver medal in the 2006–07 Danish Superliga. On 6 March 2008, he published he would leave Midtjylland at the end of the season for personal reasons.  He took some time off going back to USA and with no active participation in football, except from being a pundit on Danish TV on some occasions. On 1 January 2009 he started as head coach for AGF. After a good start of the 2009/2010-season, AGF had a terrible spring that ended up in relegation to the Danish 1st Division. Four days after the season had ended Rasmussen was sacked.

In October 2012 he replaced Benny Nielsen as manager of Greve Fodbold on a contract running until the end of 2012.

In February 2017 he became new manager of Vendsyssel FF following a takeover of the club. He led the club to 2nd place in his first season, but failed to get the club promoted via play-off. He resigned on 8 May 2018.

References

External links 
 Danish national team profile
 Peders Fodboldstatistik profile
  Boldklubben Frem profile
 MISL stats

1960 births
Living people
Danish men's footballers
Denmark international footballers
Danish football managers
Køge Boldklub players
Herfølge Boldklub players
Wichita Wings (MISL) players
Boldklubben Frem players
Brøndby IF players
Wichita Wings (NPSL) players
Baltimore Blast (NPSL) players
Indoor soccer players
Major Indoor Soccer League (1978–1992) players
National Professional Soccer League (1984–2001) players
Danish expatriate men's footballers
Expatriate soccer players in the United States
Danish expatriate sportspeople in the United States
Køge Boldklub managers
Næstved Boldklub managers
FC Midtjylland managers
Aarhus Gymnastikforening managers
Association football midfielders
People from Brøndby Municipality
Vendsyssel FF managers
Sportspeople from the Capital Region of Denmark